Henrieta Nagyová was the defending champion but lost in the final 6–4, 6–4 against Barbara Paulus.

Seeds
A champion seed is indicated in bold text while text in italics indicates the round in which that seed was eliminated. The top two seeds received a bye to the second round.

  Barbara Paulus (champion)
  Ruxandra Dragomir (semifinals)
  Karina Habšudová (first round)
  Patty Schnyder (second round)
  Barbara Schett (first round)
  Henrieta Nagyová (final)
  Denisa Chládková (second round)
  Katarína Studeníková (quarterfinals)

Draw

Final

Section 1

Section 2

External links
 1997 Warsaw Cup by Heros Draw

Warsaw Open
1997 WTA Tour